In geometry, the triaugmented dodecahedron is one of the Johnson solids. It can be seen as a dodecahedron with three pentagonal pyramids attached to nonadjacent faces. When pyramids are attached to a dodecahedron in other ways, they may result in an augmented dodecahedron, a parabiaugmented dodecahedron, a metabiaugmented dodecahedron, or even a pentakis dodecahedron if the faces are made to be irregular.

External links
 

Johnson solids